Shayda Award (Gujarati:શયદા ઍવોર્ડ) is an annual award given to a young Gujarati ghazal poet. It was founded by the INT Aditya Birla Centre for Performing Arts & Research. The award is named after Gujarati ghazal poet Harji Lavji Damani, known by his pen name Shayda. A prize of  10000 is awarded to recognize and promote Gujarati ghazal poets.

Recipients 
The Shayda Award has been granted annually since 1998 to the following people:

See also 

 Kalapi Award

References

Awards established in 1998
1998 establishments in Gujarat
Gujarati literary awards